JD Dillard is an American film director, producer, and screenwriter best known for his work on Sleight (2016), Sweetheart (2019), and Devotion (2022).

Early life
Dillard was raised as a Navy brat, the son of Bruce and Geri Dillard. His father was a Naval flight officer and the second African-American selected to fly for the Blue Angels.

Career
In March 2013, Dillard directed a trailer for Empire of the Suns second album Ice on the Dune. In 2016, he directed the science fiction crime drama film Sleight, for Blumhouse Tilt. According to a /Film interview in 2017 with Dillard, a plan of remaking David Cronenberg's The Fly was at its early phase of negotiations. Dillard disclosed in the interview that he might work with Alex Theurer, the co-writer of the movie Sleight, for the remake: "For me – and this would be about The Fly, but this is also about Alex and my approach to remakes because post-Sleight that has been the conversation for what a lot of big flashy studio gigs are – no matter what, we want to start with character". In January 2019, he wrote and directed the horror film Sweetheart, starring Kiersey Clemons. In February 2019, Legendary Entertainment won a bidding war for Mastering Your Past, which was written by Dillard. In September 2019, he directed an episode of The CW series Two Sentence Horror Stories. In December 2019, he cameoed as Stormtrooper FN-1226 in Star Wars: The Rise of Skywalker.

In 2020, he directed an episode of the HBO miniseries The Outsider. In February 2020, Dillard was in negotiations to direct The Return of the Rocketeer, a sequel to the 1991 film The Rocketeer, which will be released on Disney's streaming service, Disney+ and was attached to the project for several years. In the same month, Variety reported that Dillard and Luke Cage writer Matt Owens were developing a Star Wars film though Disney and Lucasfilm never officially made an announcement. In June 2020, Dillard directed an episode of the CBS All Access series The Twilight Zone. In September 2020, he directed an episode of the Amazon Prime Video series Utopia. In February 2021, he directed the action war film Devotion, starring Jonathan Majors. In May 2021, he was in discussions to direct an untitled Superman reboot for DC Films. In November 2022, Dillard announced he was not attached to make films based on Star Wars, Rocketeer, and Superman.

Filmography

Film

Television

Actor 
 Star Wars: The Rise of Skywalker (2019), role: Stormtrooper FN-1226

Music 
 Ice on the Dune (2013), directed the trailer for the album only

Accolades
In January 2016, Dillard was nominated at the 2016 Sundance Film Festival Awards, in the category "Best of Next!", for his work on Sleight. In February 2018, Dillard received two nominations at the Black Reel Awards of 2018, in the categories "Best Emerging Filmmaker" and "Best First Screenplay", also for his work on Sleight.

References

External links
 

21st-century American male writers
21st-century American screenwriters
American film directors
American male screenwriters
American male television writers
American television writers
Living people
Place of birth missing (living people)
Year of birth missing (living people)